The Firehall Arts Centre (also called the Firehall Centre for the Arts) is an arts centre in the Downtown Eastside of Vancouver, British Columbia, Canada. The building also falls within the borders of Gastown. Firehall is a small building, originally built as a fire station in 1906. Three theatre companies are based out of Firehall: Touchstone Theatre, Firehall Theatre Company, and Axis Mime. Firehall is devoted to exhibiting dance, performance art, and new plays. Firehall is Vancouver's foremost exhibitor of experimental theatre. The theatre has a 150-seat capacity. St. James Anglican Church is diagonally opposite the intersection from Firehall. Every year, Firehall hosts a dance festival called "Dancing on the Edge" that lasts two weeks.

References

Fire stations completed in 1906
1906 establishments in British Columbia
Alternative theatre
Dance in Canada
Defunct fire stations in Canada
Mime
Modernist theatre
Performing arts centres in Canada
Theatres in Vancouver
Downtown Eastside